The 2002 British Open was the 2002 edition of the British Open professional ranking snooker tournament, that was held from 9–17 November 2002 at the Telford International Arena, Telford, England.
 
Paul Hunter won the tournament by defeating Ian McCulloch nine frames to four in the final. The defending champion, John Higgins, was defeated by McCulloch in the quarter-final. The players each wore a red and blue shirt 


Main draw

Final

References

British Open (snooker)
British Open
Open (snooker)